Alda Leona Wilson (April 29, 1910 – 1993) was a Canadian sprinter who specialized in the 80 m hurdles. In this event, she finished sixth at the 1932 Summer Olympics and fifth at the 1934 British Empire Games.

References

External links 
 
 
Alda Wilson, my grandmother, died 1993, not 1996. 

1910 births
1996 deaths
Canadian female hurdlers
Olympic track and field athletes of Canada
Athletes (track and field) at the 1932 Summer Olympics
Commonwealth Games competitors for Canada
Athletes (track and field) at the 1934 British Empire Games